= Brighton Film Festival =

Brighton Film Festival may refer to one of two film festivals in Brighton, England:

- CINECITY: The Brighton Film Festival, founded in 2003 and funded by the BFI
- Brighton Rocks International Film Festival (BRIFF), for independent cinema
